{{DISPLAYTITLE:C2H6OS}}
The molecular formula C2H6OS (molar mass: 78.13 g/mol, exact mass: 78.0139 u) may refer to:

 Dimethyl sulfoxide (DMSO)
 2-Mercaptoethanol, or β-mercaptoethanol